A number of ships have been named Monte Cervantes, including:

 
 

Ship names
de:Monte Cervantes (1927)
es:Monte Cervantes